Asociația Fotbal Club UTA Arad, commonly known as UTA Arad or simply UTA, is a Romanian professional football club based in the city of Arad, Arad County, which competes in the Liga I. The UTA acronym stands for Uzina Textilă Arad ("Textiles Factory of Arad").

Founded in 1945 as IT Arad, the team has won six national titles and two Cupa României. Domestically, UTA is one of the most successful Romanian sides of the 20th century, sharing with Chinezul Timișoara the record for the most title wins outside Bucharest. This earned UTA the nickname of Campioana Provinciei ("the Provincial Champion"), which it lost at the conclusion of the 2020–21 season when newcomer CFR Cluj claimed its seventh Liga I trophy.

UTA Arad's decline started with a relegation to the second division in 1979, and it appeared sparringly in the top flight before being dissolved in 2014. A new entity started its way back to the top from the Liga IV, the fourth level of the Romanian league system, and managed to return to the Liga I in 2021.

"The Old Lady" plays in red and white uniforms at the new Francisc von Neuman Stadium, which was opened in 2020 and can seat 12,700 persons. UTA holds a long-standing rivalry with neighbouring Politehnica Timișoara, with whom it contests the West derby.

History

Establishment and first success (1945–1965)
The "old lady" was founded by the baron Francisc von Neuman, the owner of the Arad Textile Company, on April 18, 1945. The colors of the club (white – red) were inspired by Arsenal's colors, Neuman being a great fan of this team.

It was here, on the corner, where the UTA platform is. Where the stadium is today, across the street. He held a meeting, there were many of his friends, engineers, trusted people. He said he wants to make a football team, who has a name to propose? Someone said Gloria, who was gone, someone else proposed to be like the factory: ITA. It was their factory! Good. And what colors should the team have? After many discussions it was noted to be white with green. Nobody knows today that for a few minutes, UTA had these colors: white-green. Then the baron, who had in mind the red-white combination of Arsenal, but he was so delicate he did not want to impose anything, was saved by someone from the community who said he could not "white with green, because are Nazi colors." People woke up and the colors remained white and red like on Highbury. Like Highbury was going to be the stadium, just a little smaller. (Dionisie Piros)

The first football match of the newly established team was on 27 May 1945 against Banatul Sânnicolau Mic, score 2–3. The composition of the first team was: Tudor, Bocşa, Tamaş, Lingurar, Dvorszak, Szurdi, Găluţ, Mărienuț, Haller, Cosnita, Brosovszky. Coaches: Francis Dvorszak, Joszef Szallay and Gheorghe Albu.

On 1 September 1946 on the occasion of the match between ITA and Ciocanul București, score 1–0, took place the inauguration of the stadium in Arad, Francisc von Neuman Stadium. At that time it was considered the most beautiful stadium in the country.

The club enters in the National Football Championship, in the 1946–47 edition, bearing the name ITA., the initials of the company. The first participation, in the first league, bring the first title of champion, with a difference of 11 points ahead of the second place, occupied by the Carmen București. The composition of the first championship team was: Alexandru Marky, Gyula Lóránt, Gheorghe Băcuț, Adalbert Pall, Francisc Mészáros, József Pecsovszky, Adalbert Kovács, Ioan Reinhardt, Andrei Mercea, Ladislau Bonyhádi, Mátyás Tóth. Ladislau Bonyhádi becomes the goalscorer of the championship with 26 goals.

In the 1947–48 edition, ITA. won the second championship title, with an impressive goal difference of 129–21, record unbeaten until today and Ladislau Bonyhádi contributed with 49 goals, also an all-time record. In this edition the final of the Cupa României was against CFR Timișoara, also won with the score of 3–2. The winning team was: Alexandru Marky, Moise Vass, Zoltan Farmati, Gheorghe Băcuț, Adalbert Pall, József Pecsovszky, Adalbert Kovács, Ioan Reinhardt, Ladislau Bonyhádi, Iosif Stibinger, Nicolae "Coco" Dumitrescu.

At the end of 1948–49 season, ITA was ranked only 9th.

In the 1950 edition, under the name of Flamura Roșie, the club won a new title of champion. In the same year they qualified in the Cupa României final, but lost 1–3 in front of CCA București. The team used in the final of the cup was: Alexandru Marky, Moise Vass, Zoltan Farmati, Adalbert Pall, Ioan Reinhardt, Ladislau Băcuț, Silviu Boitoş, Mihai Carpinet, József Pecsovszky, Andrei Mercea, Nicolae "Coco" Dumitrescu.

In 1951 the club was ranked 4th at the end of the competition.

In 1952 the "old lady" occupied the 8th place, and in 1953 was on the third place and won a new edition of the Romanian Cup, against CCA București, score 1–0. The winning team was: Francisc Kiss, Gavril Szücs, József Kapás, Zoltan Farmati, Mihai Carpineţ, Gavril Serfözö, Nicolae Popa, Gheorghe Wencesla, Adalbert Kovács, Andrei Mercea, Nicolae "Coco" Dumitrescu, Mircea Popovici, Gheorghe Lupeş. Coach: Coloman Braun-Bogdan.

In 1954, under the direction of the coach Braun-Bogdan, the white and reds won the fourth title of champion. The members of the team were: Francisc Kiss, Gavril Szücs, József Kapás, Dusan, Zoltan Farmati, Gavril Serfözö, Vichentie Birău, Gheorghe Váczi, Ilie Don, Andrei Mercea, Nicolae "Coco" Dumitrescu.

In 1955 Flamura Roșie occupied the 5th place at the end of the competition, in 1956 they finished on the 6th place, and at the end of the 1957–58 edition the club finished on 10th place.

In 1958 the club changed its name from Flamura Roșie to UTA. (Arad Textile Factory).

In the following years UTA occupied the following positions at the end of the championship: 1958–59 – 8th, 1959–60 and 1960–61 – 7th, 1961–62 – 10th, 1962–63 and 1963–64 – 11th, 1964–65 – 5th.

The second Golden Generation (1965–1975)

In 1965 Nicolae "Coco" Dumitrescu and Ioan Reinhardt were appointed as coaches, and at the end of 1965–66 edition, UTA finished the domestic competition on the 10th place, but qualified again in the final of the Romanian Cup, where, however, will lose with the score of 0–4 against the Steaua București. The team used in the final of the cup was: Carol Weichelt, Gavrilă Birău, Dumitru Chivu, Christos Metskas, Ioan Igna, Vasile Jac, Emil Floruţ, Nicolae Pantea, Flavius Domide, Mihai Țârlea, Mircea Axente, Ladislau Pecsovszky.

In the 1966–67 edition of the Divizia A, it occupied the 11th position. In the same period the club participated in the 5th edition of the Balkan Cup, being assigned in the 1st Series with Cherno More Varna, Partizani Tirana and Fenerbahçe. UTA had a modest run and only succeeded in one match out of six, a victory against Fenerbahçe in Arad, score 1–0.

In the 1967–68 edition it occupied the 4th place at the end of the season.

In the 1968–69 Divizia A season it became the champion of the country for the fifth time. The squad was: Gheorghe Gornea, Ion Bătrina, Gavrilă Birău, Ștefan Bakos, Ştefan Czako, Mircea Axente, Eugen Pojoni, Petru Șchiopu, Mircea Petescu, Flavius Domide, Iosif Lereter, Ilie Moț, Viorel Sima, Ladislau Brosovszky, Florian Dumitrescu, Viorel Brândescu, Ion Atodiresei, Bodea

In the 1969–70 season, UTA won its sixth title and participated for the first time in the European Champion Clubs' Cup, but was defeated in the first round by Legia Warsaw (1–2 and 0–8).

In the 1970–71, the "old lady" took the 4th place and again participated in the European Champion Clubs' Cup, succeeding in eliminating the trophy holder at that time, Feyenoord after a 1–1 at Rotterdam and 0–0 in Arad. The squad for the double against Feyenoord Rotterdam was: Gheorghe Gornea, Gavrilă Birău, Iosif Lereter, Mircea Axente, Eugen Pojoni, Mircea Petescu (captain), Flavius Domide, Dumitru Calinin, Ladislau Brosovszky, Otto Dembrovski, Florian Dumitrescu. Reserves: Ion Bătrina, Petru Șchiopu, Viorel Sima, Ştefan Czako.

Before the match in the Netherlands, the players of Feyenoord Rotterdam, intercontinental champions at that time, were amused by the value and the look of the Arad team: They ironized us when they saw how we were dressed. They wanted to give us a new equipment from head to toe. Eventually, we played with boots, leggings and shorts from them, and our t-shirts, remembered Gavrilă Birău. But on the pitch the situation was different, because Florian Dumitrescu opened the score in the 14th minute: I centered, and he hit with his head, although he did not excel at the head shot. remembered Mircea Axente. Feyenoord then equalized by Jansen in the 25th minute and 1–1 remained to the end, with all the assault of the Dutch at the gate of Gornea and in the despair of the nearly 70,000 spectators. coach Nicolae "Coco" Dumitrescu described.

Before the Arad second match, scheduled for 30 September 1970, exactly one year after the humiliation in Warsaw, Ernst Happel, the Austrian coach of Feyenoord said: A qualification of the Romanians at our expense would be equivalent to the eighth wonder of the world. The match ended 0–0, so UTA, supported by over 20,000 people, and, thanks to the goal scored in away, qualified further. After the game, UTA fans shouted at the coach of Feyenoord in front of Astoria Hotel: "Happel, Happel, Ha, Ha, Ha!".

In the second round UTA was eliminated from the competition by Red Star Belgrade (0–3, 1–3).

In the 1971–72 edition the "old lady" became vice-champion of Romania and participated in the UEFA Cup, reaching the quarterfinals after overtaking Austria Salzburg (4–1, 1–3), Zagłębie Wałbrzych (1–1, 2–1) and Vitória Setúbal (3–0, 0–1). They were eliminated in the quarter-finals by Tottenham Hotspur, the first game was at home where they lost 2–0. The second leg at away at White Hart Lane in London was a 1–1 draw, however this was not enough and Arad were knocked out 3–1 on aggregate.

In the 1972–73 UTA took the 9th place in the Divizia A and participated for the second time in the UEFA Cup but was eliminated in the first round of the Swedish team IFK Norrköping.

In the following editions UTA occupied the following positions at the end of the championship: 1973–74 – 5th, 1974–75 – 8th, 1975–76 – 15th, 1976–77 – 12th and 1977–78 – 10th.

The decline and bankruptcy (1975–2013)
The decline started in the 1975–76 edition, materialized with a 17th place in the 1978–79 edition, thus UTA relegated for the first time in its history to Divizia B.

After two years in the second division (3rd place in 1979–80 and 9th in 1980–81), UTA returned to Divizia A under the technical leadership of coach Ştefan Czako, but failed to last for more than a year, relegating again to the second division after occupying only 17th place in Divizia A at the end of 1981–82 season.

In the following two Divizia B seasons the team occupied the following positions: 2nd in 1982–83 and 5th in 1983–84, when, from the team coached by Gavrilă Birău and Flavius Domide were part the following players: Lovas, Bubela, Bodi, Gheorghieș, Gal, Hirmler, Gaie, Csodras, Țârlea, Váczi II, Vânăru, Găman, Tisza, Iliescu, Lupău, Roxin, Corec, Vuia, Cigan, Lalu, Leuc, Terez, Ţucudean, Negrău, Varşandan.

In the summer of 1984, UTA became a working football club, adopting the name of FCM (Workers Football Club) UT Arad.

Between 1984 and 1991, UTA occupied the following positions in the 3rd Series of Divizia B: 13th in 1984–85, 4th in 1985–86, 10th in 1986–87, 3rd in 1987–88, 2nd in 1988–89, 2nd in 1989–90, 5th in 1990–91.

And in the 2nd Series of Divizia B: 2nd in 1991–92 and 1st in 1992–93.

After the promotion, the "old lady" managed to maintain only two years in the Divizia A, occupying the 11th place in the 1993–94 season and the 18th place in the 1994–95 edition, relegating again in the Divizia B.

Between 1995 and 2002, UTA occupied the following positions in the 2nd Series of Divizia B: 5th in 1995–96, 13th in 1996–97, 11th in 1997–98, 2nd in 1998–99, 6th in 1999–2000, 7th in 2000–01 and 1st in 2001–02.

In the summer of 1999, UTA Arad disputed a play-off match at Alba Iulia against Rocar București for promotion in the Divizia A, a match lost 0 – 2. Coach Francis Tisza aligned the following team: Pap – Diaconescu, Botiş, G. Radu (50' Ciubăncan), Găman (76' Baciu), Panin – Todea, Almaşan, Zaha – Mariş, Cl.Drăgan (69' Turcan).

In the 2002–03 edition of Divizia A, it is ranked 16th and relegated after only one year in the first league.

In the 2003–04 season, it occupied the 9th place of the 3rd Series of the Divizia B and in the 2004–05 season it took the 11th place at the end of the competition in the same series.

In the 2005–06 season, UTA finished 16th and relegated in Divizia C, for the first time in its history.

But UTA Arad will not play in this league because after an assignment agreement with Liberty Salonta, UTA would take the place of Liberty in Liga I and Liberty would take the place of UTA in Liga III.

Thus, qualified in Liga I for the 2006–07 season, club president Nicolae Bara signed with coach Marius Lăcătuş and under his leadership, UTA occupied the 12th place at the end of the season.

Marius Lăcătuş resigned on 1 October 2007 and at the end of the 2007–08 season, UTA, coached by Roland Nagy, owned by Nicolae Bara and Sandu Ion, occupied the 17th place and relegated again to the Liga II.

In the 2nd Series of the Liga II the white and reds occupied the following positions: 9th in 2008–09, 4th in 2009–10, 8th in 2010–11 (after a penalty of 12 points), 4th in 2011–12 and 4th in 2012–13.

In August 2013, Adrian Marțian, a controversial businessman, took over Giovanni Catanzariti's majority stake, promising the financial recovery of the club and to bring back the good results, but by November he lost the support of the supporters and the legend of the club, Flavius Domide, asking him to leave the club to competent people from Arad.

Another team, supported by a part of UTA fans, called UTA Bătrâna Doamnă was founded in 2013 by former player Marius Ţucudean, was enrolled in Liga IV instead of UTA II and receiving in March 2014 the logo, the record and the colors of UTA from UTA Supporter Club, the owner of these, becoming officially UTA Arad. The Liga II team had to change their name to FC UTA SA. At the end of the 2013–2014 season of Liga II, UTA SA was excluded from the championship by FRF for not attending two matches and relegated to the 6th League, where it did not sign up and therefore was dissolved.

Rebirth (2013–present)
UTA Bătrâna Doamnă, promoted in the Liga III at the end of the season after a promotion play-off match against Hunedoara County champion Retezatul Hațeg, and won 2–0.

After only one season in the Liga III the club promoted back to Liga II after finishing 1st in the 4th Series of the league, at 4 points ahead the second place, Nuova Mama Mia Becicherecu Mic.

In their first season after the returning in the Liga II, UTA, now known as UTA Bătrâna Doamnă finished 2nd in the 2nd Series of the championship and qualified for a Liga I promotion play-off against Dunărea Călărași and Voluntari. The "old lady" eliminated Dunărea Călărași 5–4 on aggregate, but they lost 1–3 against Voluntari and remained for another season in Liga II.

In the 2016–17 season, UTA finished 3rd, now in a one group of 20 teams, and qualified again for a promotion play-off, this time against Poli Timișoara, one of Politehnica Timișoara successors, together with ASU Politehnica Timișoara, but they lost again the chance to return in the first league, now after a double defeat (1–2, 1–3).

In the summer of 2017, FRF has officialized that UTA Bătrâna Doamnă changed its name back to FC UTA Arad being the official and legal successor of the old club.

After finishing on the 12th and 13th position in the 2017–18 and 2018–19 seasons, UTA finally came through in the 2019–20 season. Under Laszlo Balint's command, the team won the Liga II and promoted in Liga I after a 12-year wait. Starting in the 2020–21 season, UTA will finally return after a six-year wait on Stadionul Francisc von Neuman.

Grounds

The club plays its home matches on Stadionul Motorul in Arad, because their stadium, Stadionul Francisc von Neuman, is under reconstruction.
Because the reconstruction of Stadionul Francisc von Neuman will not be ready until 2020, the club decided to modernise Motorul Stadium.
The new stadium has around 12.700 seats available. The first match on the new ground was on 29th August, UTA Arad - FC Voluntari.

Support

UTA also have a large collective of supporters named Ultras Arad. The only active ultras group of this collective is called Out of Control. Former groups: Red Fighters(1996–2006), Spetza Ultra Rossa(2003–2011), Directivo Ultra', Commando Hooligans, RASA, Red Skorpions, Rascals. After Spetza Ultra Rossa quit, all the remaining groups united into one single group named Arad 1945 which lasted from 2012 to 2016. Their main rivalry is with the supporters of Politehnica Timișoara, but also with Rapid București, Bihor Oradea and Universitatea Cluj. They have a friendship with fans of Corvinul Hunedoara and ultras of Steaua București.

Rivalries
UTA's most important rivalry is with Politehnica Timișoara. The match between them, Derbiul Vestului (West Derby), has been one of the leading Romanian football encounters in the last 65 years, as UTA and Poli are the two most successful football teams from the west of the country. Other less important rivalries are against Rapid Bucuresti, FC Bihor Oradea and FC Universitatea Cluj.

Honours

Domestic

Leagues
Liga I
Winners (6): 1946–47, 1947–48, 1950, 1954, 1968–69, 1969–70
Runners-up (1): 1971–72
Liga II
Winners (4): 1980–81, 1992–93, 2001–02, 2019–20
Runners-up (6): 1982–83, 1988–89, 1989–90, 1991–92, 1998–99, 2015–16
Liga III
Winners (1): 2014–15
Liga IV – Arad County
Winners (1): 2013–14

Cups
Cupa României
Winners (2): 1947–48, 1953
Runners-up (2): 1950, 1965–66
Cupa României – Arad County Phase
Winners (1): 2013–14
Cupa Ligii
Runners-up (1): 1994

European
UEFA Champions League / European Cup
Best result: Second round 1970–71
UEFA Europa League / UEFA Cup
Best result: Quarter-finals 1971–72
Balkans Cup
Best result: Group stage 1966–67

European record

Players

First-team squad

Out on loan

Club officials

Board of directors

 Last updated: 6 September 2022

Current technical staff

 Last updated: 1 November 2022

Notable former players
The footballers enlisted below have had international caps for their respective countries at junior and/or senior level. Players whose name is listed in bold represented their countries at junior and/or senior level on through the time's passing. Additionally, these players have also had a significant number of caps and goals accumulated throughout a certain number of seasons for the club itself as well.

Romania-Hungary
   Ladislau Bonyhádi
   Iosif Petschovsky
   Mátyás Tóth
Romania
  Alexandru Albu
  Liviu Antal
  Justin Apostol
  Ion Atodiresei
  Mircea Axente
  Gheorghe Băcuț
  Ionuț Bălan
  Cristian Bălgrădean
  Gavrilă Birău
  Vichentie Birău
  Ioan Bogdan
  Sorin Botiș
  Ladislau Brosovszky
  Marcel Coraș
  Marius Curtuiuș
  Flavius Domide
  Claudiu Drăgan
  Lucian Dronca
  Helmuth Duckadam
  Florian Dumitrescu
  Nicolae "Coco" Dumitrescu
  Adrian Găman
  Gheorghe Gornea
  Ioan Hora
  Florin Hidișan
  Cristian Ianu
  Alexandru Ioniță
  Silviu Iorgulescu
  Emerich Jenei
  Adalbert Kovács
  Iosif Lereter

Romania
  Adrian Lucaci
  Dennis Man
  Cristian Melinte
  Bogdan Mara
  Alexandru Marky
  Andrei Mercea
  David Miculescu
  Ilie Moț
  Adalbert Pall
  Cristian Panin
  Nicolae Pantea
  Ion Pârcălab
  Mircea Petescu
  Adrian Petre
  Ovidiu Popescu
  Paul Popovici
  Ioan Reinhardt
  Ciprian Rus
  Mircea Sasu
  Petru Șchiopu
  Viorel Sima
  Iosif Slivăț
  Iosif Stibinger
  Sorin Strătilă
  Dumitru Târțău
  Cristian Todea
  Mihai Țârlea I
  Mihai Țârlea II
  George Țucudean
  Adrian Ungur
  Gheorghe Váczi
  Constantin Varga
  Norbert Varga
  Moise Vass

Argentina
  Maximiliano Laso
Brazil
  Roger
Bosnia and Herzegovina
  Branko Grahovac
Cameroon
  Jérémie N'Jock
Central African Republic
   Ali Calvin Tolmbaye
Croatia
  Filip Dangubić
Hungary
  Gyula Lóránt
Italy
  Remo Amadio
  Nicolao Dumitru
Lithuania
  Tomas Švedkauskas
  Modestas Vorobjovas
  Rolandas Baravykas
  Karolis Laukžemis
Nigeria
  John Ibeh
  Prince Ikpe Ekong
Portugal
  Bruno Simão
  Edson Silva
  Amoreirinha

Russia
  Yevgeni Shlyakov

Serbia
  Nenad Kovačević
  Nikola Vasiljević
  Predrag Pocuca

Notable former managers

  Zoltan Blum
  Gheorghe Borugă
  Coloman Braun-Bogdan
  Nicolae "Coco" Dumitrescu
  Francisc Dvorzsák
  Ion "Jackie" Ionescu
  Gusztáv Juhász
  Marius Lăcătuș
  Ion Moldovan
  Roland Nagy
  Zoltan Opata
  Ionuț Popa
  Ioan Reinhardt
  Petre Steinbach

League history

References
Notes

Citations

External links
 
 Club profile on UEFA's official website

 
Arad, Romania
Association football clubs established in 1945
Football clubs in Arad County
Liga I clubs
Liga II clubs
Liga III clubs
Liga IV clubs
Fan-owned football clubs
1945 establishments in Romania